Jack Neville is an English born rugby union player who plays for Nottingham Rugby in the RFU Championship. He plays internationally for Hong Kong.

Career 
Neville played rugby for Cardiff University while studying a bachelor's degree in Science, Business/Managerial and Economics.

During his time at Cardiff University Neville played for his home town club Darlington Mowden Park, who at the time were in National Two North.

In 2014 Neville joined Hong Kong Premiership side Kowloon RFC, intern joining the HKRU elite rugby programme.

After a period of time with the Hong Kong Sevens team, he joined the South China Tigers squad for the inaugural Global Rapid Rugby season, making 2 appearances at the back end of the season, scoring on debut. Although part of the squad, due to being part of the HKRU elite rugby programme, he did not feature in the 2020 season due to Coronavirus causing the season to be cut short.

In 2021 he joined Spanish División de Honor side Alcobendas where they came runners up in the 2021/22 season.

Neville joined English Championship side Nottingham in 2022 with his former Hong Kong and South China Lions coach Craig Hammond now the Nottingham head coach.

International career 
Neville made his international debut, coming off the bench against Russia on the 17th November 2017.

He has since made 17 appearances, scoring 6 tries.

Honours 
2017 Cup of Nations Runners Up (Hong Kong)

2018 Asia Rugby Championship (Hong Kong)

2019 Asia Rugby Championship (Hong Kong)

2021/22 División de Honor Runners Up (Alcobendas)

2022 Asia Rugby Championship (Hong Kong)

References 

Living people
Rugby union
Hong Kong
Hong Kong rugby union players
Hong Kong rugby sevens players
Rugby sevens
Rugby sevens players
1992 births